Lehel Fekete (born 31 January 1957) is a Canadian fencer. He competed in the individual foil event at the 1976 Summer Olympics.

References

1957 births
Living people
Canadian male fencers
Olympic fencers of Canada
Fencers at the 1976 Summer Olympics
Sportspeople from Ottawa
20th-century Canadian people